Frances Degen Horowitz (May 5, 1932 – March 15, 2021) was an American developmental psychologist who served as President of the Graduate Center, City University of New York from 1991 to 2005.  She was instrumental in raising the stature of the institution and moving it to its current location in the B. Altman and Company Building on Fifth Avenue of New York City.

Horowitz served as president of the American Psychological Association (APA) Division 7 (Developmental Psychology) from 1977 to 1978. She served as president of the American Psychological Foundation from 1991 to 1994 and as president of the Society for Research in Child Development from 1997 to 1999.

Horowitz was known for her research and teaching around the world, particularly in infant behavior and development. She authored more than 120 articles, chapters, monographs, and books on the subjects of infant development, early childhood development, high-risk infants, the gifted, and theories of development.

Biography
Frances Degen was born in the Bronx and raised in a predominantly Jewish neighborhood. She met her future husband, Floyd Ross Horowitz, when she was 11 years old. They married in 1953 and had two sons together.

Horowitz completed a bachelor's degree in philosophy at Antioch College in 1954. She obtained a master's degree in elementary education at Goucher College, also in 1954.  After working as a public school teacher in Iowa City, she returned to school to pursue a doctorate in developmental psychology, graduating from the University of Iowa in 1959. She completed her dissertation, titled The incentive value of social stimuli for preschool children, under the supervision of Boyd R. McCandless at the Iowa Child Welfare Research Station.

Horowitz was an assistant professor at Southern Oregon College from 1959 to 1961 before joining the faculty of the University of Kansas. She served as Founder and Chair of the Department of Human Development and Family Life from 1968 to 1978, and as Vice Chancellor for Research, Graduate Studies and Public Service at the University of Kansas from 1978 to 1991.

Honors and awards
Horowitz was a member of Sigma Xi, as well as a fellow of both the American Psychological Association and the Association for Psychological Science. She held a fellowship at the Center for Advanced Study in the Behavioral Sciences from 1983 to 1984. She was elected a fellow of the American Association for Advancement of Science in 1994, the New York Academy of Sciences in 2000, and a member of the American Academy of Arts and Sciences in 2004. She was named Chair of the Antioch College Board of Trustees in 2012.

Horowitz received the Outstanding Educator of America Award in 1973.  She was awarded the Distinguished Psychologist in Management Award from the Society of Psychologists in Leadership in 1993. She was named an Alumni Fellow of the University of Iowa in 2005.

Books 

 Horowitz, F. D. (1975). Visual attention, auditory stimulation, and language discrimination in young infants. University of Chicago Press.
Horowitz, F. D. (Ed.) (1978). Early developmental hazards: Predictors and precautions. Routledge.
Horowitz, F. D. (1987). Exploring developmental theories: Toward a structural/behavioral model of development. Psychology Press.
 Horowitz, F. D., Subotnik, R. F., & Matthews, D. J. (Eds.). (2009). The development of giftedness and talent across the life span. American Psychological Association.

Representative papers

References

External links 

 Towards 2044: Horowitz Early Career Scholar Program of the Society for Research in Child Development

1932 births
2021 deaths
American women psychologists
Jewish American academics
American developmental psychologists
Antioch College alumni
Goucher College alumni
University of Iowa alumni
Graduate Center, CUNY faculty
University of Kansas faculty
Fellows of the American Psychological Association
Fellows of the Association for Psychological Science
Center for Advanced Study in the Behavioral Sciences fellows
Fellows of the American Association for the Advancement of Science
Fellows of the American Academy of Arts and Sciences
American women academics
21st-century American Jews
21st-century American women